David A. Hobbs (born  April 25, 1949) is a former American basketball coach.  Hobbs preveously served as a special assistant to Iowa State's head coach Steve Prohm. He was the men's head coach at the University of Alabama from 1992 to 1998 and also was an assistant coach at Alabama, the University of Kentucky and Virginia Commonwealth University (VCU).

Early years
Hobbs was born in Lynchburg, Virginia.  He lettered his junior and senior seasons (1970–71) at Virginia Commonwealth University (VCU), where he earned a bachelor's degree in education (1972) after spending his first two seasons playing at Virginia's Ferrum Junior College.

Coaching career
Throughout his career, Hobbs has coached teams to more than 400 victories and 18 postseason tournament appearances, including 16 in the NCAA tournament.

His coaching career began in the prep ranks at Mechanicsville High School in Mechanicsville, Virginia for eight seasons, the last three as head coach.

Virginia Commonwealth
His first job in college coaching came at Virginia Commonwealth, where he served as an assistant coach with Tubby Smith on J. D. Barnett's staff. Hobbs spent six years (1980–85) coaching on the Rams' staff.

Alabama
Hobbs was hired at Alabama as an assistant coach for Wimp Sanderson in 1985 and spent the next seven years at that position, helping the Crimson Tide win one SEC Championship and four SEC Tournament crowns while the Tide made four appearances in the NCAA tournament's Sweet 16. As an assistant, he had the opportunity to coach such All-SEC performers as Robert Horry, James "Hollywood" Robinson and Latrell Sprewell.

When Sanderson left Alabama following the 1992 season, Hobbs was named head coach. In his first season, the Tide finished 16–13 and advanced to the NIT. In 1994 and 1995, Alabama recorded 20-win seasons and advanced to the NCAA Tournament behind the play of NBA All-Star Antonio McDyess. In 1996, Hobbs led UA to a 19–13 mark and a berth in the NIT Final Four. He resigned his post following the 1998 season after compiling a 110–76 (59.4%) career record and producing nine All-SEC players.

Kentucky
David Hobbs joined the UK staff in 2000 and served seven years as an assistant coach under Tubby Smith, including five as assistant head coach.  He was not retained by the university when Smith left in 2007.

After departure from Kentucky
After leaving Kentucky, Hobbs was a scout for the NBA's Charlotte Bobcats for two years, followed by a short stint as coach of Japan's national basketball team.  He was terminated from that job after being on medical leave.

Family
Hobbs is married to Barbara "Skeet" Fleet Hobbs and they have two grown children, Heather and David, Jr.

Head coaching record

College

References

External links
 Iowa State profile

1949 births
Living people
Alabama Crimson Tide men's basketball coaches
American expatriate basketball people in Japan
American men's basketball coaches
American men's basketball players
Basketball coaches from Virginia
Basketball players from Virginia
College men's basketball head coaches in the United States
Ferrum Panthers men's basketball players
High school basketball coaches in the United States
Japan national basketball team coaches
Junior college men's basketball players in the United States
Kentucky Wildcats men's basketball coaches
Sportspeople from Lynchburg, Virginia
VCU Rams men's basketball coaches
VCU Rams men's basketball players